The 1973 Grambling Tigers football team was an American football team that represented Grambling College (now known as Grambling State University) as a member of the Southwestern Athletic Conference (SWAC) during the 1973 NCAA Division II football season. In its 31st season under head coach Eddie Robinson, Grambling compiled a 10–3 record (5–1 against conference opponents), tied for the SWAC championship, and outscored opponents by a total of 339 to 176. In two post-season games, the Tigers defeated Delaware in the Boardwalk Bowl and lost to Western Kentucky in the Grantland Rice Bowl.

Schedule

References

Grambling
Grambling State Tigers football seasons
Southwestern Athletic Conference football champion seasons
Grambling Tigers football